Qeshlaq-e Pelazir (also Romanized as Qeshlāq-e Pīlāz̄īr; also known as Pīlarz) is a village in Anbaran Rural District, Anbaran District, Namin County, Ardabil Province, Iran. At the 2006 census, its population was 24, in 9 families.

References 

Towns and villages in Namin County